Chahlari Ghat Bridge (also called Chahlari Ghat Setu चहलारी घाट in Hindi) is a bridge over the river Ghaghra connecting Bahraich in the east to Sitapur in the west of Uttar Pradesh.

It is result of the efforts of Prominent socialist leader Mukhtar Anis who known as "Ganjer Ke Gandhi".

References

See also 
List of longest bridges in the world
List of longest bridges above water in India
List of bridges in India
Kacchi Dargah-Bidupur Bridge

Bahraich
Bridges in Uttar Pradesh
Ghaghara
Sitapur district